The 1952–53 League Algiers Football Association season started on September 14, 1952 and ended on June 7, 1953. This is the 31st edition of the championships.

Final results

Division Honneur 
 Clubs of Division Honneur
The Division Honneur is the highest level of League Algiers Football Association, the equivalent of the elite for this league. It consists of twelve clubs who compete in both the title of "Champion of Division Honneur" and that of "Champion of Algiers", since it is the highest degree.

First Division 
 Groupe I
 Groupe II
 Groupe III
 Results of Playoffs First Division

Second Division 
 Groupe I
 Groupe II
 Groupe III
 Groupe IV
 Results of Playoffs Second Division

Third Division 
 Groupe I
 Groupe II
 Groupe III
 Groupe IV
 Results of Playoffs Third Division

References

External links
League Algiers

League Algiers Football Association seasons
1952–53 in Algerian football
Algeria